Dattatray Vaman Potdar (5 August 1890 – 6 October 1979), better known as Datto Vaman Potdar, was an Indian historian, writer, and orator. He was the Vice-Chancellor of University of Pune during 1961 - 1964.

The British colonial Government of India had honored Potdar with the title Mahamahopadhyaya in 1946. He was honored by government of india with Padmabhushan in 1967. Because of his vast knowledge, he was sometimes called as Dr. Johnson of Maharashtra or a living encyclopedia.

Potdar was a disciple of the historian Vishwanath Kashinath Rajwade, and served as a trustee of Pune based  Itihas Sanshodhak Mandal (इतिहास संशोधक मंडळ) founded by Rajwade. His  disciples included Pandurang Sadashiv Sane, Swami Swaroopanand, Vasudeo Sitaram Bendrey, Sethu Madhav Rao Pagadi, and Ramchandra Chintaman Dhere.

Early life
Potdar was born into Deshastha Brahmin family in the village of Birwadi in Raigad District of Maharashtra. Potdar completed his matriculation in 1906 from Nutan Marathi Vidyalaya in Pune, and four years later received a bachelor's degree in History and Marathi from the then University of Bombay affiliated Ferguson college in Pune.

Career

Potdar became a teacher in 1912 at Shikshan Prasarak Mandali's  Nutan Marathi Vidyalaya, his former school. He left the school in 1920  as the Head Master of the school. Shikshan Prasarak Mandali appointed him as a professor in 1921 at New Poona College (later renamed S. P. College) in Pune. He remained in that position until 1935.

Potdar had mastered Sanskrit to the extent that he could fluently converse in it. He also was proficient in Persian and this proved to be valuable while conducting Historical Research.

Scholarly career
In 1910, Sardar Mehendale, V. K. Rajwade, and Potdar founded Itihas Sanshodhak Mandal. Potdar maintained passionate interest through his life in the growth of the Mandal.
He traveled all over India, collecting historical documents pertaining especially to Maratha empire and Marathi literature. He ran periodicals, delivered speeches, and organized lecture series, inspiring others to research historical papers. He only once went abroad and that was to what in those times was USSR.
In 1965, the Government of Maharashtra appointed Potdar to write the biography of Shivaji, but before he could finish  the assignment, he died on 6 October 1979 in Pune.

Personal
Potdar remained a lifelong  bachelor.

Works
Vasantik Upadesh in IX parts (Marathi) – 1917 to 1929
Apale Pune (Marathi) – 1921
Marathi Gadyacha Ingraji Avtar (Marathi) – 1922
Thorle Madhavrao (Marathi) – 1928
Bodhprad Pustika for students in XII parts (Marathi) – 1935
Marathi Itihas va Itihas Sanshodhan (Marathi) – 1935
Maharashtra Sahitya Parishadecha Itihas (Marathi) – 1943
Jaypur Darshan (Marathi) – 1948
Suman Saptak (Marathi) – 1950
Maharashtra Deshachya Itihasache Sankshipt Varnan (Marathi) – 1951
Samaj Shikshan Mala (Marathi) – 1952
Shrote Ho ! (Marathi) – 1959
Bharatachi Bhashan Samasya (Marathi) – 1960
Me Europat kay pahile ? (Marathi) – 1960
Olakh (Marathi) – 1961
Inside Maharashtra (English) – 1964
Lokmanya Tilakanche Sangati (Marathi) – 1975
Besides the above, Potdar has to his credit over 600 historical articles (Marathi and English).

Editorial works
Devdas krut Sant Malika – 1913
Marathe Va Ingraj – 1922
Dr. Johnson Yanche Charitra – 1924
Sahitya Sopan – 1931
N.M.V.Smarak Grantha – 1933
Shivdin Kesari Krut Dnyan Pradeep – 1934
Vaktrutva : Krushnashastri Chiplunkar – 1936
Maza Pravas – Vishnubhat Godse – 1966
English East India Company cha Peshwe Darbarshi farsi patravyavahar
Vad yanchya Athwani : Parvatibai Paranjpe – 1971

Affiliations
Potdar was closely associated with 68 organizations. including the following:
Bharat Itihas Sanshodhak Mandal, Pune
Nutan Marathi Vidyalaya
University of Pune
University of Bombay
Deccan Gymkhana
Pune Marathi Granthalaya
Shikshan Prasarak Mandali
Pune Corporation
Bhandarkar Institute
Maharashtra Sahitya Parishad
Tilak Maharashtra Vidyapith
Shri Chhatrapati Sambhaji Smarak Mandal
Narvir Tanaji Smarak Mandal
Samyukta Maharashtra Parishad
Peshwe Daftar Committee
Vaktrutvottejak Sabha
Ved Shastrottejak Sabha
S.N.D.T.College
 Maharashtriya Kalopasak, Pune

Honors
1939 – President of Akhil Bharatiya Marathi Sahitya Sammelan held at Ahmednagar
1945 – President of Maharashtra Rashtra Bhasha Parishad
1945 – Vice Chancellor of Tilak Maharashtra Vidyapith
1946 – ‘Mahamahopadhyaya’ title by Government of India
1956 – Deputy of Bombay Government at Florence, Italy.
1960-1962 – First President of Akhil Bharatiya Marathi Sahitya Mahamandal
1961 to 1964 – Vice Chancellor of the University of Pune
1962 – Honored as ‘Sanskrut Prachyavidya Pandit’ by Government of India
1963 – Leader of the committee of Indian Vice Chancellors for visit to Russia
1965 – Honored as ‘Vidya Vachaspati’ in the All India Hindi Meet at Prayag
1967 – Received ‘Padma Bhushan’ from the President of India
1967 – ‘Doctor of Literature’ from Kashi Vidyapith

See also
Shikshana Prasarak Mandali
List of Marathi people
Indian Rebellion of 1857

References

‘Datto Vaman’ (Marathi) by Shubhalaxmi Potdar
‘Potdar Vividh Darshan’ (Marathi) by D.P.Ranade
Autobiography by Acharya P.K.Atre
‘Ashi Manase Yeti’ (Marathi) by Setu Madhavrao Pagadi
‘History of Sarpotdars’ by Harshad Sarpotdar

External links
 

1890 births
1979 deaths
Marathi-language writers
Savitribai Phule Pune University alumni
Indian male writers
Scientists from Pune
Recipients of the Padma Bhushan in literature & education
People from Raigad district
20th-century Indian historians
Presidents of the Akhil Bharatiya Marathi Sahitya Sammelan